Sympistis richersi is a moth of the family Noctuidae first described by James T. Troubridge in 2008. It is found in the US state of California.

The wingspan is about 30 mm.

References

richersi
Moths of North America
Endemic fauna of California
Moths described in 2008
Fauna without expected TNC conservation status